Björn Christian Edström (born March 18, 1976 in Gävle, Sweden) is a Swedish-born American professional rally co-driver. He started competing as a co-driver in 1997, from 2006 to 2016 alongside Travis Pastrana.

Rally America National Championship Series

2006 season
2006 was Edstrom's first year with Subaru, and his first full year with driver Travis Pastrana, with the introduction of the new Subaru Rally Team USA. Edstrom and Pastrana became 2006 Rally America National Series Champions. Christian was awarded the Grant Whitaker Cup as the top co-driver in the Rally America Series.

Results

2007 season
In 2007, Christian ran the full National Championship Series with Subaru Rally Team USA.  He was awarded the Grant Whitaker Cup for the second time.

Results

2008 season
In 2008, Christian took a sabbatical, competing in only one rally.

Results

2009 season
In 2009, Christian returned to Subaru Rally Team USA and ran the full National Championship Series with Travis Pastrana.  He won the Grant Whitaker Cup for the third time.

Results

2010 season
In 2010, Christian and Travis Pastrana finished the season third overall.

Results

2016 season
After a six year sabattical, Edström and Pastrana competed in three events.

Results

Production World Rally Championship

2007 season
In addition to efforts in the United States, Edstrom and Pastrana teamed up with driver Takuma Kamada to form Subaru Rally Team International while the team contested the Production World Rally Championship, a series that runs concurrent with the WRC. They competed in the 21º Corona Rally México, Rally Argentina, and Wales Rally GB rounds of the championship.

Results

2008 season
Not long after a deer caused terminal damage to Edstrom and Pastrana's Subaru in the  Sno*Drift Rally in Atlanta, MI, Edstrom announced a sabbatical to concentrate on his career and family.  Former McRae co-driver Derek Ringer teamed with Pastrana for the remainder of the season.

External links
Official Site for Christian Edstrom
Subaru Rally Team USA
"Nerd Powered": X Games 12 Interview with Christian. By Brian Kamenetzky
Profile on Rallybase

1976 births
Living people
Swedish emigrants to the United States
Swedish rally co-drivers
X Games athletes
People from Gävle
World Rally Championship co-drivers
Sportspeople from Gävleborg County